Alice Belcher Tweedy (1850–1934) was an American journalist and writer. She was the first woman to be accepted at the College of Arts and Sciences at Washington University in St. Louis, and the first woman to work for the St. Louis Democrat. She also wrote for the New York Evening Post and contributed to Popular Science Monthly, or PopSci, from 1889 to 1896. Her work paved the way for future women in journalism.

Tweedy wrote articles on the bacteriological research of milk, education and motherhood, the importance of outdoor exercise for women, and women's suffrage. Tweedy's articles are often focused on science and feminism. She believed in the right to vote and the importance of access to education for women. Tweedy was quoted by the editor in the October 1896 volume of Popular Science Monthly for disclaiming the idea that "women's suffrage is proposed as a panacea for social evils, or that it will usher in a millennial condition. Man would be disenfranchised if such requirement was made of his vote."

Tweedy also wrote poetry. In February 1905, her poem "War's Song" was published in the Vol. 67 of The Advocate of Peace.

References

American women journalists
American feminists
19th-century American journalists
1850 births
1934 deaths
19th-century American women
Washington University in St. Louis alumni